Qntal I is the debut album of the German Darkwave/Gothic rock/Industrial band Qntal.

The album features a mix of medieval lyrics in languages like Latin, Middle High German and Middle French combined with electronic music of the late 1980s Dark Scene.

In 2007 it was re-released on Noir Records.

Track listing

References
[ Qntal I] at Allmusic.com

1992 albums
Dark wave albums